The El Salvador Fed Cup team represents El Salvador in Fed Cup tennis competition and are governed by the Federación Salvadorena de Tenis. They have not competed since 2013.

History
El Salvador competed in its first Fed Cup in 1992.  Their best result was reaching the Group I promotion play-offs in 2003 and 2004.

See also
Fed Cup
El Salvador Davis Cup team

External links

Billie Jean King Cup teams
Fed Cup
Fed Cup